Marine Attack Squadron 144 (VMA-144) was a reserve Douglas A-4 Skyhawk attack squadron in the United States Marine Corps.   Originally known as VMSB-144, the squadron saw its first combat in World War II as part of the Cactus Air Force during the Battle of Guadalcanal and also provided close air support during the Bougainville campaign (1943-1945).  Following the war the squadron was deactivated but later became part of the Marine Air Reserve and was based out of Naval Air Station Jacksonville and then Naval Air Station Cecil Field, Florida.

History

World War II
Marine Scout Bomber Squadron 144 (VMSB-144) was formed at Naval Air Station San Diego on September 7, 1942.  They remained in California for training until early 1943 when they departed for the South Pacific, travelling through Noumea and Efate, where the ground echelon remained.  The squadron's flight echelon  landed at Henderson Field on Guadalcanal on February 5, 1943.  They returned from their first combat tour on March 12, 1943.  The entire squadron returned to Guadalcanal on June 13, 1943.  The flight echelon moved to the Russell Islands for the month of July, returning to Henderson Field and then moving to Efate again.  The squadron's flight echelon moved to Munda on October 15, 1943 and from November 1 to November 21, they provided close air support to troops during the Battle of Bougainville.  On January 12, 1944, the squadron boarded ship to begin their return to the United States.

The squadron relocated to Marine Corps Air Station El Toro, California and was redesignated as Marine Torpedo Bomber Squadron 144 (VMTB-144) on October 14, 1944. A month later, on November 5, they were again redesignated as VMTB-144(CVS) as they trained to operate from the Navy's escort carriers. In December 1944, the squadron moved to Marine Corps Air Station Mojave, California to continue training. During this time their designation was also reverted to VMTB-144. Following the end of the war, the squadron returned to Marine Corps Air Station Miramar and was deactivated on December 9, 1945

Reserve years
Sometime after the war, the squadron was reactivated as Marine Attack Squadron 144 (VMA-144) and were part of the Marine Air Reserve and based out of Naval Air Station Jacksonville and then Naval Air Station Cecil Field, Florida. The squadron was decommissioned on October 31, 1965.

See also
 United States Marine Corps Aviation
 List of active United States Marine Corps aircraft squadrons
 List of decommissioned United States Marine Corps aircraft squadrons

Notes

References
Bibliography

Web

 VMA-144 Skyhawk page

144
Inactive units of the United States Marine Corps